Salt Creek is a stream in Juab County, Utah.

See also
List of rivers of Utah

References

Rivers of Utah
Rivers of San Juan County, Utah